Jans Bay is a northern hamlet in the Canadian province of Saskatchewan.

Demographics 

See also 

 List of communities in Northern Saskatchewan
 List of communities in Saskatchewan

References 

Division No. 18, Saskatchewan
Northern hamlets in Saskatchewan